Earlandia is a genus of prehistoric foraminifera.

See also 
 Arthur Earland (1866–1958), a British oceanographer, microscopist and expert on Foraminifera
 List of prehistoric foraminifera genera

References

External links 
 
 Earlandia at WoRMS
 Earlandia at fossilworks

Prehistoric Foraminifera genera
Fusulinida